The River Dwyryd (meaning a river of two fords) is a river in Gwynedd, Wales which flows principally westwards; draining to the sea into Tremadog Bay, south of Porthmadog.

Geography
The Dwyryd rises in the hills to the north of Ffestiniog. At its most northern extent, water draining from Moelwyn Mawr drains into Llyn Ystradau, the outflow of which forms the source of the Afon Goedol. This is joined by the River Bowydd at grid reference: . Below Rhyd y Sarn, the river is joined by the Afon Cynfal which flows from the east down a deep wooded gorge which includes the spectacular Rhaeadr Cynfal (Cynfal waterfall) south of Ffestiniog. The main river then flows through a wide valley formed by glaciation, with a broad flat base formed from glacial moraines and riverine gravel deposits. The valley, the Vale of Ffestiniog, has much agriculture but is subject to routine winter flooding.

The Afon Tafarn-helyg has its confluence about  further downstream. This tributary rises south of Gellilydan and just north of the reservoir of Llyn Trawsfynydd but does not receive any water from the reservoir.

There are a number of small lakes and reservoirs in the woodlands north of Plas Tan y Bwlch which also drain south into the river. These lakes include Llyn y Garnedd, Llyn Hafod y Llyn and Llyn Mair.

At Maentwrog the Dwyryd becomes a long and sandy tidal estuary, flowing under the road and railway line at Pont Briwet, before joining with the estuary of the River Glaslyn and then entering into Porthmadog Bay. The Afon y Glyn which drains the southwest catchment from Llyn Tecwyn Uchaf and Llyn Tecwyn Isaf enters the southern side of the Glaslyn estuary at the south end of a large extent of salt marsh known as Glastraeth (green beach) on its south bank and opposite the village of Portmeirion.

The whole of the river drains off igneous and ancient rocks of the Cambrian and Ordovician which are all base-poor.  Much of the catchment has also been used for commercial forestry during the last hundred years. As a consequence, many of the tributaries are highly acidic as a result of atmospheric acidification. This has constrained the quality of the fishery and the biodiversity in many tributaries.  Some of these problems have been exacerbated by past industrial activities including metal mining, slate mining, animal skin processing and the use by the army of a gunnery range with large amounts of emplaced metal cartridge shells.

Afon Prysor
The Afon Prysor is the largest tributary of the Dwyryd, entering its left bank in the tidal section downstream of Maentwrog. It rises in the hills to the east of Trawsfynydd and flows past the southern end of the village to enter Llyn Trawsfynydd, a large reservoir close to the A470. Prior to construction of the dam in the 1920s for hydroelectric power, the river had wandered across a broad upland marsh here known as Cors Goch. It is the only inland water in the UK that has been used as a source of cooling water for a nuclear power station. The Afon Prysor resumes its course below the dam, to flow down to the Dwyryd through the steeply wooded valley of Ceunant Llennyrch which is at the core of a national nature reserve. Most of the flow from the reservoir is channelled through the hydro-electric power station close to Maentwrog; the flow then re-joins the Prysor just before the confluence.

River traffic
At no point is the river deep enough to accommodate sea-going ships, but in the second half of the 18th century a number of quays were constructed west of Maentwrog from which small vessels took cargoes of timber and, increasingly, slate to be transferred to sea-going ships in deeper water southwest of what would become Porthmadog, transferring to Porthmadog itself when its harbour was opened in 1824. The river was and remains so shallow that viable cargoes could only be carried at spring tides. Some of the quays remain to this day, used by anglers. The opening of the Ffestiniog Railway in 1836 dealt a mortal blow to the Dwyryd traffic, which ended completely by 1860.

References

Sources

Further material

External links
The river on navigable OS maps with satellite overlays National Library of Scotland

Dwyryd
Dwyryd